Ornon is a mountain range in Lasithi in eastern Crete, Greece. It trends from west to east starting at Kavousi in Ierapetra and ending at Praesos in the east. Part of the Sitia Mountains, it is northeast of Thrypti and south of the Western Siteia Foothills, which border on the north coast to the west of Sitia.

Geography 
The Ornon mountains are entirely in the municipality of Ierapetra in Lasithi regional unit. The canyons, or gorges, are cut deeply into the edges of the massif by runoff from above, a process facilitated by the softness and solubility of limestone. Caves and deep cuts abound.

Notes

Citations

External links

Mountains of Crete
Mountain ranges of Greece
Landforms of Lasithi